To Heal a Nation is a 1988 drama television film that tells the true story of Jan Scruggs (played by Eric Roberts), a decorated veteran of the Vietnam War. The film was directed by William A. Graham.

The film was made available on video on January 6, 1993.

Premise 
In 1979, Scruggs is working for the US Department of Labor. He becomes obsessed with the dream of erecting a monument to the people who died in Vietnam.

Cast
 Eric Roberts
 Glynnis O'Connor
 Marshall Colt

External links
 
 
 https://www.nytimes.com/films/film/78927/To-Heal-a-Nation/overview
 

American biographical films
Vietnam War films
1988 films
American drama television films
1980s English-language films
1980s American films